Leniz Point, also known as Barbaro Point, is the northern extremity of the small peninsula on which Mount Banck stands, lying  south of Bryde Island on the west coast of Graham Land, Antarctica. It was first charted by the Belgian Antarctic Expedition under Gerlache, who made a landing here on February 10, 1898. The toponym appears on a Chilean government chart of 1951 and is for Clorindo Leniz Gallejo, the chief stoker on board the tender Yelcho which rescued the crew of the Endurance from Elephant Island in August 1916.

References

Headlands of Graham Land
Danco Coast